Diana Sierra is a Colombian social entrepreneur and industrial designer.  She is co-founder and chief executive officer of Be Girl.

Biography 
Sierra graduated from Columbia University and Universidad de Los Andes. Her work in South America and East Africa focused on women's empowerment programs and using design to help solve problems many women faced in those regions.

In 2020, she joined the Women in the Sanitation Economy Innovation Lab.

References 

Living people
Year of birth missing (living people)
Columbia University alumni

Social entrepreneurs
Industrial designers